The Judges' Trial (or, the Justice Trial, or, officially, The United States of America vs. Josef Altstötter, et al.) was the third of the 12 trials for war crimes the U.S. authorities held in their occupation zone in Germany in Nuremberg after the end of World War II. These twelve trials were all held before U.S. military courts, not before the International Military Tribunal, but took place in the same rooms at the Palace of Justice. The twelve U.S. trials are collectively known as the "Subsequent Nuremberg Trials" or, more formally, as the "Trials of War Criminals before the Nuremberg Military Tribunals" (NMT).

The defendants in this case were 16 German jurists and lawyers. Nine had been officials of the Reich Ministry of Justice, the others were prosecutors and judges of the Special Courts and People's Courts of Nazi Germany. They were—amongst other charges—held responsible for implementing and furthering the Nazi "racial purity" program through the eugenic and racial laws.

The judges in this case, held in Military Tribunal III, were Carrington T. Marshall (presiding judge), former Chief Justice of the Supreme Court of Ohio; James T. Brand, Associate Justice of the Supreme Court of Oregon; Mallory B. Blair, formerly judge of the Third Court of Appeals of Texas; and Justin Woodward Harding of the Bar of the State of Ohio as an alternate judge. Marshall had to retire because of illness on June 19, 1947, at which point Brand became president and Harding a full member of the tribunal. The Chief of Counsel for the Prosecution was Telford Taylor; his deputy was Charles M. LaFollette. The indictment was presented on January 4, 1947; the trial lasted from March 5 to December 4, 1947. Ten of the defendants were found guilty; four received sentences of lifetime imprisonment, and six received prison sentences of varying lengths. Four persons were acquitted of all charges.

Indictment
 Participating in a common plan or conspiracy to commit war crimes and crimes against humanity;
 War crimes through the abuse of the judicial and penal process, resulting in mass murder, torture, plunder of private property.
 Crimes against humanity on the same grounds, including slave labor charges.
 Membership in a criminal organization, the NSDAP or SS leadership corps.

Count 4 applied only to Altstötter, Cuhorst, Engert, Joel (with respect to the SS) and to Cuhorst, Oeschy, Nebelung, and Rothaug concerning the NSDAP leadership. Both organizations had been found criminal previously by the IMT.

Count 1 was dropped: the court declared the charge to be outside its jurisdiction. Judge Blair filed a dissenting opinion that stated that the court should have made a statement that the Military Tribunals of the NMT in fact did have jurisdiction over charges of "conspiracy to commit war crimes and crimes against humanity".

All defendants pleaded "not guilty".

Defendants

The highest-ranking officials of the Nazi judicial system could not be tried: Franz Gürtner, Minister of Justice, died in 1941; Otto Georg Thierack, Minister of Justice since 1942, had committed suicide in 1946, and Roland Freisler, the President of the People's Court since 1942, was killed in a 1945 bombing raid on Berlin; Günther Vollmer, the Gauführer of Nazi jurists, had been killed in 1945. One who was alive but not tried was Hans Globke (died 1973).

All convicts were found guilty on all charges brought before them, except Rothaug, who was found guilty only on count 3 of the indictment, while he was found not guilty on counts 2 and 4. However, the court commented in its judgment that:

By his manner and methods he made his court an instrumentality of terror and won the fear and hatred of the population. From the evidence of his closest associates as well as his victims, we find that Oswald Rothaug represented in Germany the personification of the secret Nazi intrigue and cruelty. He was and is a sadistic and evil man. Under any civilized judicial system he could have been impeached and removed from office or convicted of malfeasance in office on account of the scheming malevolence with which he administered injustice.

The public considered the sentences generally too low. Most of the convicts were released already in the early 1950s; some (Lautz, Rothenberger, Schlegelberger) even received retirement pensions in West Germany. The guide to German law entitled Das Recht der Gegenwart is still being published under the name Franz Schlegelberger.

In popular culture

The Judges' Trial was the inspiration for the 1959 teleplay Judgment at Nuremberg, and the 1961 movie adaptation, Judgment at Nuremberg, starring Spencer Tracy, Burt Lancaster, Richard Widmark, Marlene Dietrich, Maximilian Schell, Judy Garland, Montgomery Clift, Werner Klemperer and William Shatner.

References

External links
 Description of the trial from the U.S. Holocaust Memorial Museum.
 The Justice Trial

United States Nuremberg Military Tribunals
Law in Nazi Germany
1947 in Germany

1947 in law
Legal ethics